In May 2021, a video advertisement of Kakoli Furniture, a shop situated in Gazipur, Bangladesh, went viral. The video became source of internet memes in which Kakoli Furniture was placed in many humorous contexts. The popularity of the memes about Kakoli Furniture resulted in increase of sales of its products.

Background
Kakoli Furniture, a furniture store, was opened a decade ago. Its slogan was "Dame Kom Mane Bhalo" (less price but still better) chosen by son of the owner. For its marketing he created video ads. Kakoli Furniture posted its TVC in its Facebook page. The slogan 'Dame Kom Mane Bhalo, Kakoli furniture.' was included at the end of the video. Another part of the video shows humorous conversation between a man and a woman.

Memes
The advertisement became popular in Bangladesh and West Bengal. After the video went viral, netizens started making funny memes about it. Anik Dutta, film director in West Bengal, made another memes about Kakoli Furniture in Eastern Bengali language. Memes were made about Ranbir Singh, Sunny Leone, Mr. Bean, Shahrukh Khan, Johnny Sins and verious person states that they use Kakoli Furniture.

References

Viral videos
Internet memes introduced in 2021
Internet memes introduced from Bangladesh